Actin, alpha skeletal muscle is a protein that in humans is encoded by the ACTA1 gene.

Actin alpha 1 which is expressed in skeletal muscle is one of six different actin isoforms which have been identified. Actins are highly conserved proteins that are involved in cell motility, structure and integrity. Alpha actins are a major constituent of the contractile apparatus.

Skeletal actin gene expression
Skeletal alpha actin expression is induced by stimuli and conditions known to cause muscle formation. Such conditions result in fusion of committed cells (satellite cells) into myotubes, to form muscle fibers. Skeletal actin itself, when expressed, causes expression of several other "myogenic genes", which are essential to muscle formation. One key transcription factor that activates skeletal actin gene expression is Serum Response Factor ("SRF"), a protein that binds to specific sites on the promoter DNA of the actin gene. SRF may bring a number of other proteins to the promoter of skeletal actin, such as androgen receptor, and thereby contribute to induction of skeletal actin gene expression by androgenic (often termed "anabolic") steroids.

Interactions 

Actin, alpha 1 has been shown to interact with TMSB4X, MIB2 and PRKCE.

See also 
Actin
ACTB

References

Further reading

External links 
  GeneReviews/NCBI/NIH/UW entry on Nemaline Myopathy